Lee Joseph Creek is a  long 1st order tributary to Rehoboth Bay in Sussex County, Delaware.  This stream is tidal for most of its course.

Course
Lee Joseph Creek rises on the Indian River divide, about 0.1 miles south of Bay City in Sussex County, Delaware.  Lee Joseph Creek then flows northeast to meet Rehoboth Bay about at Bay City, Delaware.

Watershed
Lee Joseph Creek drains  of area, receives about 44.8 in/year of precipitation, has a topographic wetness index of 648.38 and is about 0.50% forested.

See also
List of rivers of Delaware

References 

Rivers of Delaware